Year 1110 (MCX) was a common year starting on Saturday (link will display the full calendar) of the Julian calendar.

Events

By date 
 May 5: Lunar eclipse, in which the moon became totally dark according to the Peterborough Chronicle, due to an earlier volcanic eruption putting aerosols into the upper atmosphere of the earth, thus cutting off the earthlight.

By place

Asia 

 Second Chola invasion of Kalinga

Levant 
 Spring – Mawdud ibn Altuntash, Turkic ruler (atabeg) of Mosul, leads an expedition to capture the territories of the Crusaders (belonging to the County of Edessa) east of the Euphrates River. He besieges the fortress city of Edessa, but is forced to retreat, when King Baldwin I of Jerusalem (with the support of Armenian forces sent by Kogh Vasil) intervenes with a Crusader relief force.
 February – May – The Crusaders under Baldwin I besiege Beirut. The Genoese and Pisan ships blockade the harbour, Fatimid ships from Tyre and Sidon try in vain to break the blockade. The Fatimid governor flees by night through the Italian fleet to Cyprus. On May 13, Baldwin captures the city by assault. The Italians conduct a massacre among the inhabitants.
 October – December – The Crusaders under Baldwin I (supported by King Sigurd I) besiege Sidon. Norwegian ships blockade the harbour – but are nearly dispersed by a powerful Fatimid flotilla from Tyre. They are saved by the arrival of a Venetian squadron under Doge Ordelafo Faliero. On December 4, the city capitulates (under notable terms) to Baldwin.
 December – Tancred, Italo-Norman prince of Galilee, brings the Crusader castle Krak des Chevaliers in Syria under his control. He remains regent of the Principality of Antioch in the name of his cousin Bohemond II.

Europe 
 King Henry V invades Italy with a large army and concludes an agreement with Pope Paschal II at Sutri. Henry renounces the right of investiture (a dispute with the former Henry IV). In return, Paschal promises to crown him emperor and to restore to the Holy Roman Empire all the lands given to the German church (since the time of Charlemagne). 
 July 25 – Henry V marries the 8-year-old Matilda (daughter of King Henry I of England). She is crowned Queen of the Romans in a ceremony at Mainz. After the betrothal Matilda is placed into custody of Bruno, archbishop of Trier, who is tasked with educating her in German culture, manners and government.
 The dukedom of Bohemia is secured for Vladislaus I following the death of Svatopluk (the Lion) who is assassinated. Vladislaus receives support from Henry V and will rule until 1125.
 Almoravid forces under Sultan Ali ibn Yusuf occupy Zaragoza (modern Spain), bringing all of Andalusia's Muslim states under Almoravid control.

England 
 King Henry I has improvements made at Windsor Castle, including a chapel, so that he can use the castle as his formal residence.

By topic

Literature 
 The Rus' Primary Chronicle is completed. The work is considered to be a fundamental source in the history of the East Slavs.
 Approximate date of composition of Jayamkondar's Kalingattuparani,  a Tamil epic celebrating the victory of Kulottunga Chola I over the Kalinga king, Anantavarman Chodaganga in the Chola-Kalinga war that took place around this year.

Religion 
 Construction begins on Fontevraud Abbey in the French duchy of Anjou.

Births 
 Aelred of Rievaulx, English Cistercian monk and abbot (d. 1167)
 Abraham ben Isaac, Jewish rabbi and writer (approximate date)
 Abraham ibn Daud, Jewish astronomer and historian (d. 1180)
 Walter FitzAlan, Scottish High Steward (approximate date)
 Clarembald of Arras, French theologian and writer (d. 1187) 
 Diarmait Mac Murchada, Irish king of Leinster (d. 1171)
 Düsum Khyenpa, Tibetan spiritual leader (karmapa) (d. 1193)
 Eudes of Deuil (or Odo), French abbot and historian (d. 1162)
 Gertrude of Sulzbach, German queen (approximate date)
 Gilbert Foliot, English abbot and bishop (approximate date)
 Hodierna of Jerusalem, countess of Tripoli (approximate date)
 Iorwerth Goch ap Maredudd, Welsh prince (approximate date)
 John Tzetzes, Byzantine grammarian (approximate date)
 Kirik the Novgorodian, Russian monk and chronicler (d. 1156)
 Lhachen Naglug, Indian ruler of Ladakh (approximate date)
 Liu Wansu, Chinese physician of the Jin Dynasty (d. 1200)
 Eudes de St. Amand (or Odo), French Grand Master (d. 1179)
 Phagmo Drupa Dorje Gyalpo, Tibetan Buddhist monk (d. 1170)
 Reginald de Dunstanville, 1st Earl of Cornwall (d. 1175)
 Robert of Torigni, Norman monk and abbot (d. 1186)
 Rohese de Vere, countess of Essex (approximate date)
 Rostislav I, Grand Prince of Kiev (approximate date)
 Vladislaus II (or Vladislav), king of Bohemia (d. 1174)
 William III (the Child), count of Burgundy (d. 1127)

Deaths 
 July 10 – Elias I (de Baugency), French nobleman
 November 12 – Gebhard III, bishop of Constance
 Lhachen Utpala, Indian king of Ladakh (b. 1080)
 Li Jie, Chinese writer of the Song Dynasty (b. 1065)
 Richard of Hauteville, Italo-Norman nobleman
 Robert of Hauteville, Italo-Norman nobleman
 Thiofrid, Benedictine abbot of Echternach
 Vijayabahu I, Sri Lankan king of Polonnaruwa
 William Bona Anima, archbishop of Rouen

References